Martina Gusmán (born 28 October 1978) is an Argentine actress and film producer.

Biography
Martina Gusmán has produced around ten Argentinian films, including El Bonaerense (2002) and Familia rodante (2004). She also played under the direction of her partner Pablo Trapero in the film Nacido y criado and in Leonera. This last film won her several prizes, including the best young actress award by the Argentine Academy of Cinematography Arts and Sciences.

She starred in the 2010 film Carancho, which was entered into the Un Certain Regard section at the 2010 Cannes Film Festival. In 2011, she was a member of the jury chaired by Robert De Niro for the main competition at the 2011 Cannes Film Festival.

Selected filmography
 The Lighthouse (1998)
 Nada x perder (2001)
 Lion's Den (2008)
 Carancho (2010)
 White Elephant (2012)
 The Die is Cast (2015)
 El Hijo (The Son) (2019)
 The Innocent (TV series) (2021)
 Echo 3 (2022)

References

External links
 

1978 births
Living people
Argentine film actresses
Argentine film producers
Argentine women film producers
People from Buenos Aires